Jason Wilson (born April 15, 1990) is a Canadian professional ice hockey player. He is currently playing with the Atlanta Gladiators of the ECHL. Wilson was selected by the New York Rangers in the 5th round (130th overall) of the 2010 NHL Entry Draft.

Wilson played three seasons (2008-2011) of major junior hockey in the Ontario Hockey League (OHL) where he scored 95 points and registered 299 penalty minutes in 162 games played.

On May 12, 2011, the New York Rangers signed Wilson to a three-year entry-level contract.  Wilson became an unrestricted free agent on July 1, 2014, after the Rangers did not extend a qualifying offer to him.

On September 3, 2014, the Florida Everblades announced that they had signed him to a one-year contract. He was traded to the Gwinnett Gladiators on March 12, 2015.

References

External links

1990 births
Living people
Canadian ice hockey left wingers
Connecticut Whale (AHL) players
Florida Everblades players
Greenville Road Warriors players
Ice hockey people from Ontario
London Knights players
New York Rangers draft picks
Niagara IceDogs players
Ontario Junior Hockey League players
Owen Sound Attack players
Sportspeople from Richmond Hill, Ontario
Wichita Thunder players